Marie-Édouard Mununu-Kasiala (15 August 1936 – 5 December 2022) was a Congolese Roman Catholic prelate and Trappist monk.

Biography
Mununu was one of the first Trappist monks in the Democratic Republic of the Congo. He entered the Monastère Notre-Dame de l'Emmanuel de Kasanza upon its foundation in 1958. On 20 August 1967, he was ordained a priest, the first Trappist priest in the country. In December 1975, he was elected Prior of the monastery.

On 8 November 1984, Pope John Paul II appointed him Auxiliary Bishop of Kikwit. On 24 March 1985, he was consecrated Bishop of Kikwit by his predecessor, . On 19 November 2016, he retired from this position after more than 30 years in the role.

Marie-Édouard Mununu died in Brussels on 5 December 2022, at the age of 86.

References

1936 births
2022 deaths
20th-century Roman Catholic bishops in the Democratic Republic of the Congo
21st-century Roman Catholic bishops in the Democratic Republic of the Congo
Roman Catholic bishops of Kikwit
Bishops appointed by Pope John Paul II
Trappist bishops